Hyperphara is a monotypic moth genus in the subfamily Arctiinae erected by George Hampson in 1898. Its only species, Hyperphara junctura, was described by Francis Walker in 1864. It is found in Colombia.

References

External links

Euchromiina
Moths described in 1864
Monotypic moth genera